Guerra de Titanes (Spanish for "War of the Titans") was a professional wrestling pay-per-view (PPV) event produced by the Lucha Libre AAA World Wide (AAA) promotion, which took place on December 7, 2014, in Zapopan, Jalisco, Mexico . The event was the eighteenth Guerra de Titanes end of the year show promoted by AAA since 1997. The announced main event was the AAA Mega Champion El Texano Jr. defending the championship against El Patrón Alberto.

Production

Background
Starting in 1997 the Mexican professional wrestling, company Lucha Libre AAA World Wide (AAA, or Triple A) has held a major wrestling show late in the year, either November or December, called Guerra de Titanes ("War of the Titans"). The show often features championship matches or Lucha de Apuestas or bet matches where the competitors risked their wrestling mask or hair on the outcome of the match. In Lucha Libre the Lucha de Apuetas match is considered more prestigious than a championship match and a lot of the major shows feature one or more Apuesta matches. The Guerra de Titanes show is hosted by a new location each year, emanating from cities such as Madero, Chihuahua, Chihuahua, Mexico City, Guadalajara, Jalisco and more. The 2014 Guerra de Titanes show was the seventeenth show in the series.

Storylines
The Guerra de Titanes show featured sixprofessional wrestling matches with different wrestlers involved in pre-existing, scripted feuds, plots, and storylines. Wrestlers were portrayed as either heels (referred to as rudos in Mexico, those that portray the "bad guys") or faces (técnicos in Mexico, the "good guy" characters) as they followed a series of tension-building events, which culminated in a wrestling match or series of matches.

Results

References

2014 in professional wrestling
Guerra de Titanes
2014 in Mexico
December 2014 events in Mexico